The 1965 election for Mayor of Los Angeles took place on April 6, 1965. Incumbent Sam Yorty was re-elected over James Roosevelt and six other candidates in the primary election.

Municipal elections in California, including Mayor of Los Angeles, are officially nonpartisan; candidates' party affiliations do not appear on the ballot.

Election 
During the campaign, James A. Ware	 criticized both Yorty and Roosevelt for favoring "federal intervention in city affairs" and "federal encroachment", while City Councilmember Billy G. Mills criticized Roosevelt for disenfranchising minority groups; McGee was criticized by Yorty for running to split the vote. Roosevelt was backed by the Los Angeles County Federation of Labor and AFL–CIO, criticizing Yorty on his memberships of a "racially segregated private club" and his leadership. Yorty hit back with criticisms towards Roosevelt's spendings and outside spending for his campaign. In the primary election, Yorty won outright and defeated Roosevelt with a majority of the vote.

Results

References and footnotes

External links
 Office of the City Clerk, City of Los Angeles

1965
Los Angeles
Los Angeles mayoral election
Mayoral election
Los Angeles mayoral election